Holmes County is a county located in the northwestern part of the U.S. state of Florida, in the Panhandle. As of the 2020 census, the population was 19,653. Its county seat is Bonifay.

History
Holmes County was created in 1848.

The county's namesake is a point of debate.  Holmes Creek – the county's eastern boundary – bore that name before the county was created, but it was originally named Weekaywehatchee (a Creek Indian name meaning "spring creek").  One claim is that the county was named for Thomas J. Holmes, who came from North Carolina to settle in the area about 1830.  Another is that it is named after Holmes, an American Indian chief who settled in the area with his band of Red Stick Creek Indians after 1814.  He was subsequently killed in 1818 by a raiding party sent by Andrew Jackson during the First Seminole War.

Holmes County has had four county seats in its history.  The first was Hewett's Bluff (later renamed Bear Pen, then Cerro Gordo), then Pittman's Ferry, then Westville, and finally Bonifay. Bonifay has been the county seat since 1905.

Historic places
Historic places in the county include:
 Keith Cabin in Pittman
 Waits Mansion, Bonifay
 Vortex Spring, Northern Ponce de Leon
Ponce de Leon Springs State Park, Ponce de Leon

Geography
It is the fifth-smallest county in Florida by total area.

Adjacent counties
 Geneva County, Alabama – north
 Jackson County, Florida – east
 Washington County, Florida – south 
 Walton County, Florida – west

Demographics

As of the 2020 United States census, there were 19,653 people, 7,137 households, and 4,939 families residing in the county.

As of the census of 2000, there were 18,564 people, 6,921 households, and 4,893 families residing in the county. The population density was 38 people per square mile (15/km2). There were 7,998 housing units at an average density of 17 per square mile (6/km2). The racial makeup of the county was 89.79% White, 6.51% Black or African American, 1.01% Native American, 0.39% Asian, 0.03% Pacific Islander, 0.79% from other races, and 1.48% from two or more races. 1.93% of the population were Hispanic or Latino of any race.

There were 6,921 households, out of which 30.90% had children under the age of 18 living with them, 55.60% were married couples living together, 10.80% had a female householder with no husband present, and 29.30% were non-families. 26.10% of all households were made up of individuals, and 12.40% had someone living alone who was 65 years of age or older. The average household size was 2.43 and the average family size was 2.92.

In the county, the population was spread out, with 23.10% under the age of 18, 8.80% from 18 to 24, 29.30% from 25 to 44, 24.00% from 45 to 64, and 14.80% who were 65 years of age or older. The median age was 38 years. For every 100 females there were 112.90 males. For every 100 females age 18 and over, there were 113.60 males.

The median income for a household in the county was $27,923, and the median income for a family was $34,286. Males had a median income of $25,982 versus $19,991 for females. The per capita income for the county was $14,135. About 15.40% of families and 19.10% of the population were below the poverty line, including 25.70% of those under age 18 and 17.90% of those age 65 or over.

Triracial people

The so-called "Dominickers", a number of related mixed-race (white, black, and Euchee Indian) families, lived for decades after the Civil War and well into the twentieth century in a rural area near Ponce de Leon, with a separate church and segregated public elementary school. Although considered a separate ethnicity from both whites and blacks, many Dominickers married into local white families, so that group boundaries blurred; some descendants still live in the area. The 1950 federal census identified 60 members of this group living in Holmes County at that time. Few facts are known about their origins, and little has been published about them.

Politics
Holmes County is the most archetypically "Solid South" county in Florida, and in recent times the most Republican. Since 2004, Holmes County has been the most Republican of Florida's 67 counties in terms of percentage margin. It gave the fifth-highest percentage of the vote for segregationist George Wallace of any county in the country during the 1968 election, and apart from Deep South native Jimmy Carter, no Democrat since 1964 has obtained as much as thirty-four percent of the county's vote in any Presidential election.

Holmes County voted for President Donald Trump in the 2016 election with 87.9%, the highest percentage of any county in Florida. Holmes County has more registered Democrats than Republicans, but many are descendants of Dixiecrats, Southerners who register as Democrats due to tradition but vote Republican in most elections. Barack Obama earned only 15.2% of the vote in 2012.  Hillary Clinton earned a mere 10% of the vote in 2016. In 2020, Donald Trump finished with just over 89% of the vote, the highest in the state.

In the 2016 Democratic presidential primary, Holmes County was won by Bernie Sanders; one of only four counties in the state in which he received a majority and the county in which he received the highest percentage of the vote (51.7%).

Media
The Holmes County Times-Advertiser is now owned by Halifax Media. The weekly newspaper publishes each Wednesday.

 Townsend Broadcasting began Holmes County first FM radio station in 1984 broadcasting a mere 3000 watts. WTBB (townsend broadcasting Bonifay) WTBB broadcast a sound 10 format soft rock and classic oldies. WTBB general manager was Larry Donaldson assisting Mr.Donaldson who later became a radio Hit D.J. was C.J. Newcomb who went on to stations like WJST and Sunny 98.5. in the Panama City Market. WTBB was sold to Pirate Radio and studios were moved to Panama City,Fl. call sign for frequency 97.7 are still in Holmes County however studios have long gone.

Education
Holmes District School Board operates public schools. Holmes County High School and Ponce de Leon High School are its public high schools. Poplar Springs High School is a K-12 Combination School in Northeastern Holmes County and Bethlehem High School is a K-12 Combination School in the Bethlehem Community.

The Holmes County Public Library is the county's library system. It is located at 303 North J. Harvey Etheridge Street, Bonifay, Florida 32425. The library is open Tuesday-Friday 8:00am–5:00pm, and Saturday 8:00am–12:00pm and offers public computers with internet access, free wi-fi, programming for all ages, and access to e-books, e-audiobooks, and numerous online databases and resources.

Holmes County is also a part of the Panhandle Public Library Cooperative System. PPLCS also includes Calhoun and Jackson counties.

Communities

City
 Bonifay

Town
 Esto
 Noma
 Ponce De Leon
 Westville

Unincorporated communities
 Bethlehem
 Cerrogordo
 Gritney
 Pittman
 Prosperity
 Poplar Springs
 Hamp Berry's Crossroads
 Leonia
 Sweet Gum Head

Transportation

Airports
 Tri-County Airport

Major highways

  Interstate 10 
  US 90 
  State Road 2 
  State Road 79 
  State Road 81

Railroads
Holmes County has one railroad line. The primary one is the CSX P&A Subdivision, a line formerly owned by the Louisville and Nashville Railroad that served Amtrak's Sunset Limited. This service formerly went to New Orleans, but in 2005 service was truncated by the extensive damage in the Gulf area due to Hurricane Katrina. Another former L&N line existed within the northeastern corner of the county. The Georgiana Branch entered the state and county from Highnote, Alabama then ran through Esto and later Eleanor before crossing SR 2 and leaving the county towards Graceville and Campbellton, where it had a junction with the Bay Line Railroad.

See also
 National Register of Historic Places listings in Holmes County, Florida
 USS Holmes County (LST-836)

External links

Government links/Constitutional offices
 Holmes County Board of County Commissioners
 Holmes County Supervisor of Elections
 Holmes County Property Appraiser
 Holmes County Sheriff's Office
 Holmes County Tax Collector

Special districts
 Holmes District School Board
 Northwest Florida Water Management District

Judicial branch
 Holmes County Clerk of Courts
  Circuit and County Court for the 14th Judicial Circuit of Florida serving Bay, Calhoun, Gulf, Holmes, Jackson and Washington counties

Tourism links
 Holmes County Online and Chamber of Commerce

Notes

 
Florida counties
1848 establishments in Florida
North Florida
Populated places established in 1848